Tatiana Guderzo (born 22 August 1984) is an Italian professional cyclist, who currently rides for UCI Women's Continental Team .

She won the world road race championship on 26 September 2009 at Mendrisio, Switzerland and a bronze medal in the road race at the 2008 Summer Olympics.

Major results
Source:

Road

2002
 2nd  Time trial, UCI Junior Road World Championships
2004
 1st  Time trial, UEC European Under-23 Road Championships
 1st Overall Eko Tour Dookola Polski
1st Stage 5
 UCI Road World Championships
2nd  Road race
10th Time trial
 2nd Time trial, National Road Championships
2005
 1st  Time trial, National Road Championships
 2nd  Time trial, UEC European Under-23 Road Championships
 3rd Overall Giro di San Marino
 3rd GP Castilla y León
 5th Trofeo Alfredo Binda-Comune di Cittiglio
 7th Tour de Berne
2006
 UEC European Under-23 Road Championships
2nd  Time trial
2nd  Road race
 2nd Overall Tour Cycliste Féminin International de l'Ardèche
 3rd Time trial, National Road Championships
 4th Overall Emakumeen Bira
1st Stage 2
 4th Overall Holland Ladies Tour
 7th Overall Giro d'Italia Femminile
 9th Overall Gracia–Orlová
 10th Trofeo Alfredo Binda-Comune di Cittiglio
2007
 1st Westkerke Criterium
 5th Overall Giro d'Italia Femminile
 8th Durango-Durango Emakumeen Saria
 9th Open de Suède Vårgårda
 10th GP Stad Roeselare
2008
 National Road Championships
1st  Time trial
2nd Road race
 2nd Overall Iurreta-Emakumeen Bira
1st Mountains classification
 2nd Züri-Metzgete
 3rd  Road race, Olympic Games
 4th Overall Giro d'Italia Femminile
 4th Overall Giro della Toscana Int. Femminile – Memorial Michela Fanini
2009
 1st  Road race, UCI Road World Championships
 2nd Time trial, National Road Championships
 5th Overall Giro della Toscana Int. Femminile – Memorial Michela Fanini
1st Stage 3
 5th Memorial Davide Fardelli
 7th Overall Giro d'Italia Femminile
 8th Overall Tour Féminin en Limousin
2010
 1st  Time trial, National Road Championships
 3rd Overall Giro d'Italia Femminile
 5th Overall Giro della Toscana Int. Femminile – Memorial Michela Fanini
 7th La Flèche Wallonne Féminine
 7th Memorial Davide Fardelli
 9th Trofeo Alfredo Binda-Comune di Cittiglio
 10th Time trial, UCI Road World Championships
2011
 National Road Championships
2nd Road race
3rd Time trial
 3rd Overall Giro del Trentino Alto Adige-Südtirol
 4th Overall Giro d'Italia Femminile
 6th Overall Giro della Toscana Int. Femminile – Memorial Michela Fanini
 8th Grand Prix Elsy Jacobs
 9th La Flèche Wallonne Féminine
2012
 1st  Time trial, National Road Championships
 2nd Overall Vuelta a El Salvador
 2nd Grand Prix el Salvador
 2nd Trofeo Alfredo Binda-Comune di Cittiglio
 4th Grand Prix GSB
 5th Overall Trophée d'Or Féminin
 7th Overall Giro d'Italia Femminile
2013
 1st  Time trial, National Road Championships
 1st Stage 7 Thüringen Rundfahrt der Frauen
 2nd Overall Giro del Trentino Alto Adige-Südtirol
 2nd Overall Giro d'Italia Femminile
 4th Overall La Route de France
 4th Overall Holland Ladies Tour
 7th Road race, UCI Road World Championships
1st Stage 6
2014
 5th Overall Giro della Toscana Int. Femminile – Memorial Michela Fanini
 7th Overall Holland Ladies Tour
2015
 2nd Time trial, National Road Championships
 4th Overall Tour of Zhoushan Island
1st Stage 1
 8th Overall Ladies Tour of Norway
 10th Omloop van het Hageland
2016
 2nd Time trial, National Road Championships
 6th Overall Giro d'Italia Femminile
 6th Holland Hills Classic
 10th Giro dell'Emilia Internazionale Donne Elite
2017
 1st Giro dell'Emilia Internazionale Donne Elite
 10th Giro del Trentino Alto Adige-Südtirol
2018
 3rd  Road race, UCI Road World Championships
 4th Giro dell'Emilia Internazionale Donne Elite
2019
 3rd La Classique Morbihan
 8th Overall Tour Cycliste Féminin International de l'Ardèche
 8th Emakumeen Nafarroako Klasikoa
2020
 7th Giro dell'Emilia Internazionale Donne Elite
2021
 National Road Championships
2nd Road race
3rd Time trial
 3rd Donostia San Sebastián Klasikoa
 8th Overall Giro Rosa

Track

2006
 3rd  Individual pursuit, UEC European Under-23 Track Championships
2007
 1st  Individual pursuit, National Track Championships
2011
 National Track Championships
1st  Scratch
2nd Team pursuit
3rd Individual pursuit
2014
 National Track Championships
1st  Team pursuit
2nd Individual pursuit
3rd Omnium
 3rd  Team pursuit, UEC European Track Championships
2017
 1st  Team pursuit, European Track Championships

References

External links

1984 births
Living people
Italian female cyclists
Italian track cyclists
Cyclists at the 2004 Summer Olympics
Cyclists at the 2008 Summer Olympics
Olympic cyclists of Italy
Olympic bronze medalists for Italy
Olympic medalists in cycling
Cyclists at the 2012 Summer Olympics
Cyclists at the 2016 Summer Olympics
People from Marostica
Medalists at the 2008 Summer Olympics
UCI Road World Champions (women)
Cyclists at the 2015 European Games
European Games competitors for Italy
Cyclists from the Province of Vicenza